is a 2019 Japanese 3D animated science fiction film based on Osamu Dazai's 1948 novel No Longer Human and it is the first ever Polygon Pictures production not to be streamed on Netflix.

Plot
In the year 2036, breakthroughs in medical technology have led to a system of nanomachines internally implanted in all humans that can reverse illness, injury and even death. But if a person severs their nanomachines from the system, they mutate into monstrous creatures known as "Lost". Yozo, Masao and Yoshiko are now "applicants" with special powers over the Lost.

Cast

Production
Katsuyuki Motohiro is serving as supervisor. Fuminori Kizaki will direct the film at Polygon Pictures. Tow Ubukata is writing the scripts. Yūsuke Kozaki is designing the characters, and Kenichiro Tomiyasu is in charge of concept art.

Casting 
The cast of film was revealed via teaser on YouTube. The film stars Mamoru Miyano, Kana Hanazawa, Takahiro Sakurai, Jun Fukuyama, and Miyuki Sawashiro.

Release
The film premiered at the 2019 Annecy International Animation Film Festival. It was released by Funimation on October 22, 2019, in the U.S. theaters and on November 29, 2019, in Japan, While in Canada, it was released as a Television film.

Home media
In Japan, the film was released on Blu-ray and DVD on May 20, 2020.

In the United States, the film was released on Blu-ray and DVD on August 25, 2020, with an English dub.

Reception
The film won the "Axis: The Satoshi Kon Award for Excellence in Animation" award as a Special Mention at the 2019 Montreal's Fantasia International Film Festival.

Notes

References

External links
 Human Lost Official Website 
 Funimation's Human Lost Website
 
 

2019 anime films
Anime films based on novels
Films based on Japanese novels
Films directed by Katsuyuki Motohiro
Films set in 2036
Funimation
Japanese animated science fiction films
Polygon Pictures
Toho films
2019 science fiction films
Films directed by Fuminori Kizaki